Dmitry Arturovich Miller (born 2 April 1972) is a Russian theater actor.

Biography
Dmitry Miller was born on 2 April 1972 in suburban Mytishchi, Moscow Oblast, Russian SFSR, Soviet Union. After school he entered a medical college. One day he went to Moscow and saw an advertisement for the recruitment of students in drama school. He successfully auditioned and was enrolled for the course. Soon he became a student of Mikhail Shchepkin Higher Theatre School.

In 2001, Dmitry Miller graduated from the Shchepkin Higher Theatre School. The actor joined the troupe of musical theater On Basman, where he worked for almost four years.

His debut in cinema was the feature film  The Sovereign's Servant, where the actor starred as Chevalier D'Breze in a French speaking role.

Afterwards he had small roles in various television movies, such as the popular television series  Turetsky's March. Then he successfully starred the series  Next. Later he received more recognition with  Montecristo.

For his leading role in the movie  Happy Journey the actor received several awards and a nomination for Best Actor at the 49th International Festival of TV films   Golden Nymph  in Monte Carlo.

Personal life
 Wife: Actress Julia Dellos (born October 3, 1971).
 Twin daughters: Alisa-Victoria and Marianna-Darina (born in 2014).

Selected filmography
 2001: Next (TV Series) as guard
 2007: The Sovereign's Servant as Chevalier Charles de Brézé
 2008: Montecristo (TV Series) as Maksim Orlov
 2008: Two of Fate. New Life (TV Series) as Grigory
 2010: Masakra as Vladimir Pazurkevich, graph-werewolf
 2011 / 2014: Traffic Lights (TV Series) as Eduard, confirmed bachelor
 2015: The Eighties (TV Series) as Ilya, editor of  Ogonyok Magazine
 2017: Anna Karenina: Vronsky's Story as Aleksandr, Vronsky' s brother
 2021: Girls Got Game as Kudryavtsev
 2021: Champion of the World  as Sevastyanov

References

External links
 

1972 births
Living people
People from Mytishchi
Russian male film actors
Russian male television actors
Russian male stage actors
Male actors from Moscow